Ahmed-Tobias Andrä (born 20 April 1996) is an Austrian footballer.

References

External links
 

1996 births
Living people
Austrian footballers
SV Horn players
2. Liga (Austria) players
Association football midfielders